Ptolemy of Cyprus was the king of Cyprus c. 80-58 BC. He was the younger brother of Ptolemy XII Auletes, king of Egypt, and, like him, an illegitimate son of Ptolemy IX Lathyros. He was also the uncle of Cleopatra VII.

Reign over Cyprus
He appears to have been acknowledged king of Cyprus at the same time that his brother Auletes obtained the possession of the throne of Egypt, 80 BC. He neglected the precaution of obtaining confirmation of his sovereignty at Rome, and made the additional error of offending Publius Clodius Pulcher, by failing to ransom him when he had fallen into the hands of Cilician pirates. When Clodius became tribune (58 BC), he enacted a law to deprive Ptolemy of his kingdom, and reduce Cyprus to a Roman province. Cato, who was entrusted with carrying out this decree, advised Ptolemy to submit, offering him his personal safety, with the office of high-priest at Paphos and a generous pension. Ptolemy refused, and, wholly unprepared to resist Roman power and deciding to die a king, put an end to his own life, 58 BC.

References

Sources

58 BC deaths
Kings of ancient Cyprus
Ptolemaic dynasty
Year of birth unknown